The Miss Ecuador 1997 was held on April 17, 1997. There were 12 candidates for the national title; in the end of the night, Mónica Chalá from Pichincha crowned to María Jóse López from Pichincha as Miss Ecuador 1997. The Miss Ecuador competed at Miss Universe 1997.

Results

Placements

Special awards

Contestants

Casting

A casting was held to select an Ecuadorian representative to compete at Miss World 1997.

Notes

Returns

Last compete in:

1989
 Loja
1992
 Imbabura
1994
 Esmeraldas

Withdraws

 Chimborazo
 Cotopaxi
 El Oro
 Napo

External links
https://web.archive.org/web/20120725044759/http://www.missecuador.net/home/index.php?option=com_content&task=view&id=88&Itemid=52

http://www.explored.com.ec/noticias-ecuador/doce-mujeres-tras-la-corona-115109-115109.html
http://www.geocities.ws/fotitos2000/Nomina.html

Miss Ecuador
1997 beauty pageants
Beauty pageants in Ecuador
1997 in Ecuador